Salia Jusu-Sheriff (1 June 1929 – 19 December 2009) was a Sierra Leonean politician. He was the Vice President of Sierra Leone from 1987 to 1991. He used to be the leader of the SLPP party.

He was born in 1929 in Freetown. He is an economist and a lawyer. He was Minister of Finance of Sierra Leone from May 1982 to Sept 1984. Sierra Leone had two Vice Presidents, the First and Second, Jusu-Sheriff was the Second from 1987 to 1991. Jusu-Sheriff retired after Joseph Saidu Momoh was overthrown.

He died in London, UK on 19 December 2009.

References

http://freetown.usembassy.gov/history.html

1929 births
2009 deaths
Vice-presidents of Sierra Leone
People from Freetown
Finance ministers of Sierra Leone
Government ministers of Sierra Leone
Sierra Leone People's Party politicians
People from Kailahun District